Alstonia muelleriana is a tree in the dogbane family Apocynaceae which is native to southern Papua New Guinea and northeastern Queensland.

Description
The leaves are simple and produced in whorls of three or four. They are softly hairy on both sides (less so on the top) and have up to 18 lateral veins either side of the midrib.

The small flowers are about  diameter and are 5-merous, with five green sepals and five white/cream petals.

At maturity they turn brown and split longitudinally, releasing numerous small, hairy seeds that are dispersed by the wind.

Taxonomy
This species was first described in 1928 by the Czech botanist Karel Domin, who published his description in the book Bibliotheca Botanica.

Etymology
The genus name Alstonia was raised by the  Scottish botanist  Robert Brown in 1811, in honour of his countryman Charles Alston. The species epithet muelleriana is in honour of the German born Australian botanist Ferdinand von Mueller.

Distribution and habitat
The range of the hard milkwood is restricted to a small part of northeastern Queensland, from near Rossville to the Paluma Range north of Townsville, and also the southwestern parts of Papua New Guinea.

It grows in rainforests, but is also found in drier forests and is common in regrowth or disturbed areas.

Conservation
This species is listed by both the Queensland Department of Environment and Science and the IUCN as least concern. The IUCN states in its assessment that the population is stable and that no current or future threats have been identified.

Gallery

References

External links
 
 
 View a map of historical sightings of this species at the Australasian Virtual Herbarium
 View observations of this species on iNaturalist
 View images of this species on Flickriver

muelleriana
Trees of Australia
Flora of Queensland
Flora of Papua New Guinea
Taxa named by Karel Domin
Plants described in 1928